The following sortable table comprises the 100 most topographically prominent mountain peaks of the U.S. State of Colorado.

Topographic elevation is the vertical distance above the reference geoid, a mathematical model of the Earth's sea level as an equipotential gravitational surface.  The topographic prominence of a summit is the elevation difference between that summit and the highest or key col to a higher summit.  The topographic isolation of a summit is the minimum great-circle distance to a point of equal elevation.

This article defines a significant summit as a summit with at least  of topographic prominence, and a major summit as a summit with at least  of topographic prominence.  An ultra-prominent summit is a summit with at least  of topographic prominence.  There are 126 ultra-prominent summits in the United States.

All elevations include an adjustment from the National Geodetic Vertical Datum of 1929 (NGVD 29) to the North American Vertical Datum of 1988 (NAVD 88).  For further information, please see this United States National Geodetic Survey note.

If an elevation or prominence is calculated as a range of values, the arithmetic mean is shown.

Most prominent summits

Gallery

See also

List of mountain peaks of North America
List of mountain peaks of Greenland
List of mountain peaks of Canada
List of mountain peaks of the Rocky Mountains
List of mountain peaks of the United States
List of mountain peaks of Alaska
List of mountain peaks of California
List of mountain peaks of Colorado
List of the highest major summits of Colorado
List of the major 4000-meter summits of Colorado
List of Colorado fourteeners

List of mountain ranges of Colorado
List of mountain peaks of Hawaii
List of mountain peaks of México
List of mountain peaks of Central America
List of mountain peaks of the Caribbean
Colorado
Geography of Colorado
:Category:Mountains of Colorado
commons:Category:Mountains of Colorado
Physical geography
Topography
Topographic elevation
Topographic prominence
Topographic isolation

Notes

References

External links

United States Geological Survey (USGS)
Geographic Names Information System @ USGS
United States National Geodetic Survey (NGS)
Geodetic Glossary @ NGS
NGVD 29 to NAVD 88 online elevation converter @ NGS
Survey Marks and Datasheets @ NGS
Bivouac.com
Peakbagger.com
Peaklist.org
Peakware.com
Summitpost.org

 

Lists of landforms of Colorado
Colorado, List Of The Most Prominent Summits Of
Colorado, List Of The Most Prominent Summits Of
Colorado, List Of The Most Prominent Summits Of